The Texas Higher Education Coordinating Board (THECB) is an agency of the U.S. state of Texas's government that oversees all public post-secondary education in the state. It is headquartered at 1801 North Congress Avenue in Austin.

THECB determines which Texas public four-year universities are permitted to start or continue degree programs. THECB also evaluates degrees from other states and other nations for use in Texas. However, operations of the various universities or systems are the responsibility of each university or system board of regents.

From 1998 to 2003, it developed a higher-education plan for the state, called "Closing the Gaps by 2015". The plan's primary purpose was closing education gaps within Texas, as well as between Texas and other U.S. states. The four main goals of the plan were closing gaps in student participation, student success, excellence and research. In June 2016, the THECB released its final progress report on the state's success in meeting most of the targeted goals. The goal for enrollment of 630,000 students from fall 2000 to 2015, fell short by 25,000.

In 2015, the THECB officially adopted a new 15-year strategic plan called "60x30TX" and then implemented statewide. With the 60x30TX plan, Texas aims to award a total of 6.4 million certificates or degrees by 2030. The plan also sets targets for Hispanic, African American, male, and economically disadvantaged completers.

The board consists of nine members and one non-voting student representative, all of whom are appointed by the Governor of Texas on a staggered basis. The terms for the voting members are for six years, ending on August 31 of odd-numbered years while the student representative serves a one-year term. The board appoints the Commissioner of Higher Education who serves as the Chief Executive Officer of the THECB. The current commissioner is Harrison Keller, who assumed the post on October 1, 2019. He succeeded Raymund Paredes, who had been the commissioner since 2004.

List of commissioners 
 Jack Williams (19661968)
 Bevington Reed (19681976)
 Kenneth H. Ashworth (19761997)
 Don W. Brown (19972004)
 Raymund A. Paredes (20042019)
 Harrison Keller (2019present)

See also 

 Carnegie Classification of Institutions of Higher Education
 Center for Measuring University Performance
 List of research universities in the United States
 Research I university
 Education in Texas
 List of colleges and universities in Texas
 List of public universities in Texas by enrollment

References

External links
 Texas Higher Education Coordinating Board website

Higher Education Coordinating Board, Texas
Public education in Texas